Anhui Jianzhu University (AHJZU) is in Hefei, the capital city of Anhui of China. AHJZU is a multi-disciplinary university featuring architecture and civil engineering. It is a jointly funded university by Anhui Provincial Government and the MOHURD.

The university has 14 teaching departments (schools), There are now 50 undergraduate majors, covering seven disciplines including engineering, management, science, art, literature, law, and economics.

History 
Anhui Jianzhu University was founded in 1958.

In September 1958, in support Anhui province, 324 teachers and students of Suzhou Construction Engineering School and four teachers from Shenyang Planned Economy School came to Hefei. Jointly with 179 teachers and students in the Cadre training class of the Anhui Provincial Construction Department, The Anhui Construction Engineering School was formed in DongChenGang of Hefei city.

In September 1960, The department of civil engineering of HeFei University of Technology was incorporated into the school, and the Anhui Institute of Architecture and Industry was founded.

In 1961, Anhui Institute of Architecture and Industry was revoked, Anhui Construction Engineering School was reserved.

In August 1964, Anhui Construction Engineering School moved to LingDaTang of Hefei city. In 1971, The school moved to Jinzhai road.

In March 1983, The construction branch of HeFei University of Technology was established.

On 30 December 1986, Anhui Institute of Architecture and Industry was restored.

In 2003, a new campus was built in the Hefei Economic & Technological Development Area (HETDA).

In 2013, Anhui Institute of Architecture and Industry was renamed Anhui Jianzhu University.

Schools
School of Architecture & Urban Planning
School of Arts
School of Civil Engineering
School of Continuing Education
School of Environment & Enengy Engineering  
School of Economics & Management
School of Electronic & Information Engineering
School of Foreign Languages
School of Materials & Chemical Engineering
School of Mathematics & Physics
School of Mechanical & Electrical Engineering
School of Marxism
School of Public Administration

Research
AHJZU has eight provincial key disciplines, one national engineering laboratory, four provincial key laboratories, 10 national and provincial engineering (technology) research centers.

External links
 http://www.ahjzu.edu.cn/en/

Universities and colleges in Hefei
Educational institutions established in 1958
1958 establishments in China